Rik de Voest was the defending champion but decided not to compete.

Sam Groth won the title, defeating Ante Pavić in the final, 7–6(7–3), 6–2.

Seeds

Draw

Finals

Top half

Bottom half

References
 Main Draw
 Qualifying Draw

Challenger Banque Nationale de Rimouski
Challenger de Drummondville